Halodurantibacterium is a Gram-negative genus of bacteria from the family of Rhodobacteraceae with one known species (Halodurantibacterium flavum). Halodurantibacterium flavum has been isolated from an oil production mixture from the Daqing Oilfield in China.

References

Rhodobacteraceae
Bacteria genera
Monotypic bacteria genera